Torry/Ferryhill is one of the thirteen wards used to elect members of the Aberdeen City Council. It elects four Councillors.

Councillors

Election results

2022 election

2019 by-election

2017 election
2017 Aberdeen City Council election

2012 election
2012 Aberdeen City Council election

2007 election
2007 Aberdeen City Council election

References

Wards of Aberdeen